Armagedda is a Swedish black metal band that was founded in 1999.

By 2004 the band had split-up but was reformed in 2020.

History 
Armagedda was created in the mind of A in early 2000, but then went by the name Volkermord. Their idea was to create some spiritual disease through music that would infect and destroy human minds. A few months later, A spoke with Graav and Phycon about this idea and all were in agreement. A rehearsal tape was recorded, but remained unreleased until 2008. The band entered the studio in mid-2000 for the recording of the Volkermord demo which enjoyed a grim and raw production; released in October, limited to only 30 copies. This demo was to be released on MCD format, but postponed indefinitely. In the very beginning of the year 2001 they entered the studio once again for the recording of their debut album The Final War Approaching.

At this time the band changed their name to Armagedda (translates to 'Jehova's Hell'), and soon recorded some rehearsal tracks which were ended up on a split with suicidal Swedish act Svarthymn called In Blackest Ruin and released through the Swedish underground label Deathcult Productions. Armagedda was originally signed to Akhenaten's label Breath of Night Records for CD release in 2002, with a vinyl LP version licensed to Sombre Records Germany. A new member, Mord, joined the Armagedda horde during early Summer of 2001 to complete the Swedish line-up. This all lasted until 2004, when Graav and A decided to disband and start something new, thus creating Lönndom. The band issued a final statement:

"As you all may know, Armagedda will not bring you any future experiences. We decided after the release of Ond Spiritism that it was for the best to put this phenomenon of ours to the past, we felt that we had achieved everything we needed and seen in our dreams. To continue would have been a move in the wrong direction. Graav has chosen another path in life and is forever gone. But as certain as the end came hand in hand with Ond Spiritism a birth and beginning of something else grew in shape. However, that’s another story and it will speak for itself somewhere else...."

The band reformed in 2020 and released a new album with the following statement: "And so it was told that in the seventeenth year, things that were thought to be dead begun to stir again in the earth, as if awoken by the stench of man-fear penetrating deep beyond the reach of sunlight. Reanimated by some nameless and cursed source of vitality they say it has begun pouring and trickling from the dark crevices of the North, like an ancient curse into the veins of the world. And with the same fearful fascination that we behold something full of life being robbed of its vitality and pulse, we shall now bear witness to that which ought to be forever dead but by unnatural impulse and eager invocation is again given life, to haunt and to stalk the night of the world."

Primary members 
 Graav – vocals, guitar
 A – guitar, bass

Session members 
 Roger Markström - drums
 E. Danielsson – drums
 Winterheart - drums
 Necromorbus - drums
 Hor - drums
 Patrik Högberg - bass

Related bands
 LIK - A and Graav's black metal band.
 Lönndom - A and Graav's folk metal band.
 Leviathan - Former member Roger Markström's soloproject, with A on session-strings.
 Watain, Fucking Funeral, Bloodsoil, Dissection - E. Danielsson's bands.
 Demented - Patrik Högberg
 Maleficium - Roger Markström session drumming.
 Sterbend, Nyktalgia, Total Hate, Tairach, Krieg, Hunok, Flagellator, Kataplex, Misery Speaks - Winterheart

Discography 
 Volkermord (2000), Self-released – Demo
 In Blackest Ruin (2001), Split
 The Final War Approaching (2001), Album
 Armagedda / Woods of Infinity (2002), Split
 Black Metal Endsieg III (2002), Split
 Strength Through Torture (2002), EP
 Only True Believers (2003), Album
 In Blackest Ruin (2004), EP
 Ond Spiritism: Djæfvulens Skalder (2004), Album
 Echoes In Eternity (2007), Compilation
 I Am (2010), EP
 Live in Nurnberg (2012), Live DVD
 Svindeldjup ättestup (2020), Album

References 

Swedish black metal musical groups
Musical groups established in 1999
Musical groups disestablished in 2004
Musical quartets
Swedish musical duos
1999 establishments in Sweden